Bajadasaurus is a genus of sauropod dinosaur from the Early Cretaceous epoch (late Berriasian to Valanginian stages, between 145 and 132.9 million years ago) of northern Patagonia, Argentina. It was first described in 2019 based on a single specimen found in 2010 that includes a largely complete skull and parts of the neck. The only species is Bajadasaurus pronuspinax. The genus is classified as a member of the Dicraeosauridae, a group of relatively small and short-necked sauropods.

Bajadasaurus sported bifurcated (two-pronged), extremely elongated  extending from the neck. Similarly elongated spines are known from the closely related and more completely known Amargasaurus. Several possible functions have been proposed for these spines in Amargasaurus; the 2019 description of Bajadasaurus suggested that they could have served as passive defense against predators in both genera. The skull was slender and equipped with around 48 teeth that were pencil-shaped and restricted to the front of the jaws. The eye openings of Bajadasaurus were exposed in top view, possibly allowing the animal to look forwards while feeding. Bajadasaurus was discovered in sedimentary rocks of the Bajada Colorada Formation, which were deposited by braided rivers. It shared its environment with other dinosaurs including the sauropods Leinkupal and Ninjatitan and different theropods.

Discovery and naming 

The only specimen of the dinosaur genus Bajadasaurus was excavated in 2010 by palaeontologists of the CONICET (National Scientific and Technical Research Council), the science agency of the Argentinian government. The site is part of the Bajada Colorada Formation, a succession of sedimentary rocks in the Neuquén Basin that is dated to the late Berriasian to Valanginian stages of the Early Cretaceous (~145–132.9 million years ago). The specimen, of which only some teeth were initially exposed, was found by Argentinian palaeontologist Pablo Gallina. As fossils in this area are often fragile, the specimen was not excavated bone-by-bone in the field, but extracted as a single large block of rock and bone; before extraction, the block had been wrapped in plaster for protection. The block was prepared in a laboratory, revealing most of the skull as well as the first two and probably the fifth neck vertebrae. The specimen is now curated by the Museo Municipal Ernesto Bachmann in Villa El Chocón, Neuquén Province, under the specimen number MMCh-PV 75.

The specimen was formally described as a new genus and species, Bajadasaurus pronuspinax, by Gallina and colleagues in 2019. The generic name is derived from the Spanish word Bajada ("downhill") in reference to the Bajada Colorada locality, and the Greek saurus ("lizard"). The specific name pronuspinax is derived from the Latin pronus ("bent over forward") and the Greek spinax ("spine"), referring to the long and forward-curved  (spinous processes) of the neck. Because of the spectacular spines, the discovery of Bajadasaurus was widely reported on by international news media.

Description 

Bajadasaurus is classified as a member of the Dicraeosauridae, a family of sauropod dinosaurs. As with all sauropods, dicraeosaurids were large, four-legged herbivores with a long neck and tail and a relatively tiny head. They were small compared to most other sauropods, reaching roughly the size of present-day Asian elephants, and their neck was comparatively short. Long bifurcated (two-pronged) neural spines were a common feature of the group, although they were only extremely elongated in Bajadasaurus and the closely related Amargasaurus.

Skull 

As of 2019, it is the most complete skull of a dicraeosaurid known. The middle section of the skull is not preserved. The skull's build was gracile (slender) overall.

The  bone, which formed the front margin of the orbit, had a straight ridge on its upper half that was similar to that of Dicraeosaurus. It was pierced by a small  (opening), similar to the larger foramen seen in Dicraeosaurus. The upper-front corner of the orbit was formed by the  bone. The contribution of the prefrontal to the orbit was smaller than in Dicraeosaurus and Amargasaurus; the bone was also smaller and less robust than in these genera. Viewed from above, the side margin of the frontal was S-shaped and narrowed from back to front. As a result, the eye openings were visible in top view of the skull, unlike in related genera except Lingwulong. The rear margin of the orbit was formed by the  bone. Typically in dinosaurs, this bone featured a rearwards extending process, the posterior process. In Bajadasaurus, Dicraeosaurus, and Amargasaurus, this process was reduced and indistinct. This suggests that it was connected to the  bone at the lower rear edge of the skull, although the articulation itself is not preserved. This probable articulation was absent in diplodocids, and has not previously been documented in dicraeosaurids. In Bajadasaurus, this opening was narrow and obliquely oriented. The quadratojugal formed an obtuse angle that framed the lower rear part of the lateral temporal fenestra, different from the feature seen in diplodocids.

The , a pair of openings between the parietal and the occipital region, were extended medially (towards the mid-plane of the skull), which is an autapomorphy of Bajadasaurus (a unique feature not found in closely related genera). The , which articulated with the first vertebra of the neck, was wider than it was high. Its rear surface was not wider than its neck, which was different from Amargasaurus and Dicraeosaurus. An autapomorphy of the genus, these processes were longer and more slender than in Dicraeosaurus and Amargasaurus, being more than six times long than wide. The left and right pterygoids, the only elements of the palate that were preserved, featured a smooth crest that received the basipterygoid processes.

The teeth were restricted to the front parts of the jaws and were pencil-shaped; their narrow crowns were nearly straight or curved slightly inwards. Of the upper jaw, only the front section of the left  (the largest bone of the upper jaw) is preserved. It preserves eight  (tooth sockets), a count similar to Suuwassea, but less than in Dicraeosaurus, which had 12 teeth in each maxilla. A seemingly complete tooth row of 24 teeth was found close to, but separated from, the left maxilla. Bajadasaurus thus likely had 48 teeth in total. The dentary was slender, similar to Suuwassea but unlike the deep dentary of Dicraeosaurus. In top view, the dentaries do not form the box-shaped snout seen in diplodocids, but are more rounded with a J-shaped curvature, as is typical for dicraeosaurids. The front of the dentary had a hook-like "chin" projecting downwards, as seen in other flagellicaudatans (the group to which dicraeosaurids and diplodocids belong). In the hind part of the lower jaw, the  bone was very elongated and longer than the  bone, unlike in diplodocids.

Neck vertebrae 

Both —small, triangular bones located between the first neck vertebra and the skull—were found in articulation with the skull. These were triangular and wing-like in Bajadasaurus. As in Dicraeosaurus, it was twice as high as it was long, while its  (or vertebral body) was twice as long as it was high. The  (sidewards projecting processes) were small and directed backwards as in Suuwassea rather than downwards as in Dicraeosaurus and Amargasaurus. The neural spine of the axis was narrow and not bifurcated; it differed from other sauropods in being vertically oriented (an autapomorphy of the genus), triangular in cross-section, and tapering towards its apex.

Only a single vertebra is known from the remainder of the neck. This vertebra sported the most prominent feature of the genus, an extremely elongated neural spine that was deeply bifurcated into a left and right rod-like element. Among sauropods, it was only comparable to those of the related Amargasaurus, but the spine curved toward the front rather than being directed backwards as in that genus. The bases of the rod-like elements were triangular and compressed sideways; their cross-section along most of their length was egg-shaped. Their tips broadened slightly, unlike the acute tips in Amargasaurus. In Amargasaurus, the spines show striations on their surface that indicate that a keratin (horn) sheath was present in life. Although similar striations cannot be observed on the spines of Bajadasaurus due to poor preservation, Gallina and colleagues found it likely that the spines were covered by a horny sheath as well. The exact position of the single preserved vertebra in the neck is unclear: its morphology is comparable to the fifth neck vertebra of Dicraeosaurus, the probable sixth of Brachytrachelopan, and the seventh of Amargasaurus; based on these comparisons, it was tentatively described as the fifth neck vertebra. The centrum of this vertebra was twice as long as it was high and narrowed into a longitudinal keel on the underside; this keel was concave and broader in other dicraeosaurids.

Classification 

Dicraeosaurids are one of the three principal families comprising the Diplodocoidea, a major subdivision of sauropod dinosaurs. Within Diplodocoidea, dicraeosaurids form the sister group of the Diplodocidae, while the third family, the Rebbachisauridae, is more distantly related. Dicraeosaurids and diplodocids are united within the group Flagellicaudata, which is named after the whip-like tails characteristic of the group. The number of genera classified within Dicraeosauridae varies between studies. Gallina and colleagues, in their 2019 description of Bajadasaurus, recognised seven additional genera. The earliest is Lingwulong from the late Early to early Middle Jurassic of China, while three genera are known from the Late Jurassic—Brachytrachelopan from Argentina; Suuwassea from the United States; and the eponymous Dicraeosaurus from Tanzania. Early Cretaceous dicraeosaurids include Bajadasaurus as well as Amargatitanis, Pilmatueia, and Amargasaurus, all from Argentina. An unnamed specimen from the Itapecuru Formation of Brazil indicates that the group persisted at least until the end of the Early Cretaceous.

In their analysis of evolutionary relationships, Gallina and colleagues recovered Bajadasaurus as an intermediate member of Dicraeosauridae, more derived (more recently diverging from a common ancestor) than Suuwassea and Lingwulong, but less so than Pilmatueia, Amargasaurus, Dicraeosaurus, and Brachytrachelopan. The referral of Bajadasaurus to the Dicraeosauridae was supported by six synapomorphies (anatomical features distinguishing the group from related taxa). A subsequent analysis by John Whitlock and Wilson Mantilla, in 2020, found Bajadasaurus to be the most basal member of a clade that also contains Lingwulong and the unnamed North American taxon MOR 592. In this analysis, Bajadasaurus therefore occupies a slightly more basal position within Dicraeosauridae than indicated by Gallina and colleagues. As well as the genera recognised by the latter study, Whitlock and Wilson Mantilla found Kaatedocus and Smitanosaurus to be basal members of Dicraeosauridae.

Bajadasaurus itself can be differentiated from other dicraeosaurids by a unique combination of features, which includes four autapomorphies (a medially extended posttemporal fenestra; slender and long basipterygoid processes; vertically oriented neural spines of the second neck vertebra; and elongated, forward-curved neural spines in the neck).

Cladogram by Gallina and colleagues (2019)

       

Cladogram by Whitlock and colleagues (2020)

Palaeobiology

Function of neural spines 

Elongated and deeply bifurcated neural spines were common in dicraeosaurids. In Dicraeosaurus and Brachytrachelopan, they were inclined toward the front but remained much shorter than in Bajadasaurus. Only the spines of Amargasaurus were similarly elongated. The spines of Amargasaurus led to much speculation about their possible life appearance and function. As hypothesised by separate authors, they could have supported a sail or horny sheaths, and could have been used for display, defense, or thermoregulation. Daniela Schwarz and colleagues, in 2007, found that the double-row formed by the bifurcated neural spines along the spine of dicraeosaurids would have enclosed an air sac, the so-called supravertebral diverticulum, that would have been connected to the lungs as part of the respiratory system. In Dicraeosaurus, this air sac would have occupied the entire space between the left and right parts of the spines, while it would have been restricted to the lower third of the spines in Amargasaurus. The upper two thirds would likely have been covered by a horny sheath, as is indicated by longitudinal striations on their surface.

Gallina and colleagues, in 2019, considered this the most reasonable interpretation that may likewise be applied to Bajadasaurus. These researchers further argued that horn is more resistant to impact-related fractures than bone, and that a horny sheath would therefore have protected the delicate spines from damage. Fracturing of the spines might have been a critical threat, as the bases of the spines roofed the spinal cord. The protection of the sheath would have been further enhanced if it would have extended past its bony core. Schwarz and colleagues reconstructed Amargasaurus with horny sheaths that did not reach far beyond their bony core, as is the case for most modern reptiles. In some modern even-toed ungulates, the horny sheath can be double the length of the horn core, and the exquisitely preserved ankylosaur Borealopelta was found with horny sheaths that extended the length of its spines by 25%, demonstrating that substantial horny extensions may occur in dinosaurs as well. Gallina and colleagues speculated that the spines of Amargasaurus and Bajadasaurus might have been more than 50% longer than indicated by their bony core. Their bending would have further increased their resistance, as is the case in modern bighorn sheep.

Gallina and colleagues further speculated that the spines in both Amargasaurus and Bajadasaurus might have been used for defense. Due to its forward bend, the bifurcated neural spine of the supposed fifth neck vertebra would have reached past the head, and could therefore have been a barrier to predators. Similar, even larger spikes were postulated for the following neck vertebrae. Moderate damage would result in the break-off of the horny tips, leaving the bony spine intact. Amargasaurus lived around 15 million years later than Bajadasaurus, indicating that elongated neural spines were a long-lasting defense strategy. 

In 2022, a detailed study was published by Cerda et al. It analyzed the external morphology, internal microanatomy and bone microstructure of the hemispinous processes for the first time from the holotype of Amargasaurus and an indeterminate dicraeosaurid. Proximal, mid and distal portions of both cervical and dorsal hemispinous processes reveal that the cortical bone is formed by highly vascularized fibrolamellar bone interrupted with cyclical growth marks. Both anatomical and histological evidence does not support the presence of a keratinized sheath (i.e. horn) covering the hyperelongated hemispinous processes of Amargasaurus, and either, using a parsimonious criterium, in other dicraeosaurids with similar vertebral morphology. Osteohistology of the spines suggests that they were likely, if not exclusively, covered in a sail of skin. The spines are also highly vascularized and bear cyclical growth marks, adding credence to this theory. This could have applied to the structures possessed by Bajadasaurus as well.

Senses and feeding 
The orientation of the semicircular canals, ring-like structures in the inner ear that house the sense of balance, have been used to reconstruct habitual head postures in some dinosaurs and other extinct animals, although the reliability of this method has been repeatedly questioned. Palaeontologist Paulina Carabajal Carballido, in 2015, inferred that Amargasaurus would have had its snout facing downwards. Assuming a similar head orientation in Bajadasaurus, Gallina and colleagues hypothesised that the exposure of the eye openings in top view might have allowed the animal to look forward while feeding, while the sight of most other sauropods was limited to the sides. These researchers further speculated that this feature could have allowed for stereoscopic vision. Such stereoscopic vision would only have come into effect when the snout was downturned.

Such information can be derived by counting and measuring daily growth lines seen in cross-sections of teeth, and may help to reconstruct feeding habits in extinct animals where direct observation is not possible. Garderes and colleagues estimated that teeth were replaced at an average of 35.75 days in the maxilla, and that formation time was between 158 and 96 days in the maxilla, 176 and 144 days in the premaxilla, and between 138 and 77 days in the dentary. These values are similar to those found in other diplodocoids.

Paleoenvironment 
Bajadasaurus was recovered from the Bajada Colorada Formation, a geological formation of the Mendoza Group that is exposed in northern Patagonia. The formation is composed of red and green-brown sandstones and conglomerates of fine to coarse grain size together with bands of reddish claystones and light brown siltstones. These sediments were mostly deposited by braided rivers, as is evident by well-preserved river channels with cross bedding. Paleosols are present in the formation. The Bajada Colorada Formation overlies the Quintuco and Picún Leufú Formations. At its top, it is separated from the overlying Agrio Formation by an unconformity (sedimentation hiatus). Bajadasaurus stems from the Bajada Colorada locality, the type locality of the formation. Besides Bajadasaurus, the locality has yielded the remains of other sauropods, including the diplodocid Leinkupal laticauda and the early titanosaur Ninjatitan zapatai, as well as those of several species of theropod that can be ascribed to basal Tetanurae and possibly to abelisauroids and deinonychosaurians.

References 

Dicraeosaurids
Early Cretaceous dinosaurs of South America
Berriasian life
Valanginian life
Cretaceous Argentina
Fossils of Argentina
Neuquén Basin
Fossil taxa described in 2019